is a puzzle video game developed by Yuke's Media Creations for the Nintendo DS, based on the Japanese Lucky Puzzle, a tangram-like dissection puzzle. In the game, players use the stylus to move, rotate and flip pieces on the DS's touch screen to clear puzzles. It features over 500 different puzzles from which to choose.

A sequel, was released for WiiWare in Japan on 26 May 2009, in North America on 22 June 2009 and in Europe on 11 June 2010.

Gameplay
In each puzzle the player is given an image which they then must try to recreate using only the following seven pieces:
two identical right isosceles triangles, with sides length  and hypotenuse of length 
four right trapezoids of various sizes - the side lengths are given with the first three sides creating the two right angles:

The seven pieces form a rectangle of length 1 by 5/4.

Game modes
Tutorial: Learn the controls and how to play.
Silhouettes?: Standard play mode. Solve puzzles with no time restriction.
Time Pressure: Mode for experienced players. Stages have a time limit of 3 minutes. Players must try to solve each puzzle in less than a minute.
7 steps: Advanced mode for expert players. The player must place each piece perfectly with no room for mistakes.

With the Bragging Rights mode, multiple Neves players can compete with others who do not have a copy of the game via DS Download Play.

WiiWare version
Players of the WiiWare version of the game called NEVES Plus, (known as NEVES Plus: Pantheon of Tangrams in Europe) use the Wii Remote to grab and rotate puzzle pieces, with up to four players being able to solve the puzzle simultaneously or compete against each other in teams of two. The game also features new multiplayer modes and an Ancient Egypt-themed setting. A sequel of the game called NEVES Plus Returns (Hamekomi Lucky Puzzle Wii Returns) was released for WiiWare in Japan.

Reception

Craig Harris of IGN have given the game 7.5 out of 10 saying that the game is fun and appealing but too expensive for the amount of stuff it offers. Den of Geek gave a game 2 out of 5, criticizing its very frustrating controls. Hexus didn't gave Neves a score but praised the amount of levels. The site also stated that the game lacks Wi-Fi and multiple profile feature.

References

2007 video games
Nintendo DS games
Puzzle video games
Video games developed in Japan
Wii games
WiiWare games
Yuke's games
Multiplayer and single-player video games